The 1979 ABN World Tennis Tournament was a men's tennis tournament played on indoor carpet courts at Rotterdam Ahoy in the Netherlands. The event was part of the 1979 Colgate-Palmolive Grand Prix circuit. It was the seventh edition of the tournament and was held from 2 April through 8 April 1979. First-seeded Björn Borg won the singles title.

Finals

Singles

 Björn Borg defeated  John McEnroe 6–4, 6–2
 It was Borg's 3rd singles title of the year and the 42nd of his career.

Doubles
 Peter Fleming /  John McEnroe defeated  Heinz Günthardt /  Bernard Mitton 6–4, 6–4

See also
 Borg–McEnroe rivalry

References

External links
 Official website 
 Official website 
 ATP tournament profile
 ITF tournament details

 
ABN World Tennis Tournament
1979 in Dutch tennis
ABN World Tennis